Mulamkuzhi (Malayalam:(മൂലംകുഴി) is situated in Ernakulam district.this place is a part of corporation of KOCHI a sleepy downtown with old church

References

Tourist attractions in Ernakulam district